Kira Golovko, née Ivanova (11 March 1919 – 16 August 2017) was a Soviet and Russian theater and film actress, winner of the Stalin Prize (1947) and People's Artist of the RSFSR (1957).

Life and career 
Ivanova was born in Yessentuki, the great-niece of the poet Vyacheslav Ivanov. In 1937, she entered the Moscow Institute of Philosophy, Literature and Art to study Russian literature. In 1938 she was accepted into the auxiliary of the troupe of the Gorky Moscow Art Theatre. In 1957 she returned to the Moscow Art Theater, where she served until 1985. From 1958 to 2007, she taught at the Moscow Art Theater School. Her students included Natalia Yegorova, Boris Nevzorov, and Nikolai Karachentsov. She died on August 16, 2017, age 98. She was the widow of Soviet Admiral Arseniy Golovko, who served as Soviet Commander of the Red Banner Northern Fleet during World War II.

Filmography

References

External links

1919 births
2017 deaths
Actresses from Moscow
Stalin Prize winners
Honored Artists of the RSFSR
People's Artists of the RSFSR
Soviet film actresses
Soviet stage actresses
Russian stage actresses
Russian film actresses
Recipients of the Order "For Merit to the Fatherland", 4th class